For lists of the France national football team's results see:

France national football team results (2020–present)
France national football team results (2000–2019)
France national football team results (1980–1999)
France national football team results (1960–1979)
France national football team results (1921–1959)
France national football team results (1904–1920)